Austin Cole (born 31 October 1998) is a Canadian athlete. He competed in the mixed 4 × 400 metres relay event at the 2019 World Athletics Championships.

References

External links
 
 

1998 births
Living people
Canadian male sprinters
Place of birth missing (living people)
World Athletics Championships athletes for Canada